Marshfield was a rapid transit station on the Chicago "L". Constructed by the Metropolitan West Side Elevated Railroad, it was the westernmost station of the Metropolitan's main line, which then branched into three branches: the northwestern Logan Square branch, the western Garfield Park branch, and the southwestern Douglas Park branch. The station was in service from 1895 to 1954, when it, alongside the main line and the Garfield Park branch, was demolished to make way for the Eisenhower Expressway and rapid-transit Congress Line in its median. In addition to its use on the "L", Marshfield was served by the Chicago Aurora and Elgin Railroad (CA&E), an interurban that used the Garfield Park branch and main line's tracks, between 1905 and 1953.

The Metropolitan was one of four companies establishing the "L"; with interruptions and financial issues, it operated until 1911, when it handed operations to Chicago Elevated Railways (CER), and formally merged into the Chicago Rapid Transit Company (CRT) in 1924. The CRT continued operation of the "L" until it was taken over by the publicly-held Chicago Transit Authority (CTA) in 1947. The CA&E, on the other hand, was a descendant of the Aurora Elgin and Chicago Railway (AE&C), which had become bankrupt in the aftermath of World War I and split into the CA&E in 1921.

Substantial revisions to the lines that had been constructed by the Metropolitan had been planned since the 1930s. All told, they would replace the Logan Square branch with a subway to go directly downtown, and substitute a rapid transit right of way in the median of a Congress Superhighway (the eventual Eisenhower) for the main line and Garfield Park branch. The subway opened in 1951, removing Logan Square traffic from Marshfield. Construction then started on the Congress Line, which led to the Garfield Park trackage being replaced by temporary right of way and eliminating its service at Marshfield in 1953; at the same time, the CA&E also ended service on the affected route. This left Douglas Park trains as the sole users of the Marshfield station until April 1954, when they too used a temporary right of way to go downtown.

The Congress Line opened in 1958; the junction that Marshfield had served was maintained between the new line and the Douglas Park branch, but the station prior to this divergence was located on Racine Avenue, significantly to the east of Marshfield Avenue. An entrance to the Medical Center station on the new line was located on Paulina Street, a block west of Marshfield Avenue.

History

The Metropolitan West Side Elevated Railroad Company was granted a 50-year franchise by the Chicago City Council on April 7, 1892, and began securing right of way shortly thereafter. As designed, the Metropolitan's operations comprised a main line that went westward from downtown to diverge into three branchesone northwest to Logan Square, one due west to Garfield Park, and one southwest to Douglas Park and serve various parts of Chicago's west side. A further branch to Humboldt Park proceeded due west from the Logan Square branch past Robey Street. The franchise stipulated that this divergence take place somewhere between Wood Street and Ashland Avenue; the Metropolitan decided to place the junction at Marshfield Avenue, a minor street.

Originally intending for its railroad to be powered by steam locomotives like the competing South Side and Lake Street Elevateds, the Metropolitan decided in May 1894 to use electric traction instead. The tracks had already been largely constructed prior to the decision to electrify them, but retrofitting the third rail proved an easy task outside of the switches of the main line. The junction at Marshfield required "elaborate special work" in its switches and signals, more so than other elevated railroads at the time, and has been described as being "the most elaborate and complex junction on the Chicago elevated system" as late as 1948. The main line and Logan Square branch up to Robey had their tracks completed by the middle of October 1894, and were given power in April 1895 for test and inspection runs. They began service at 6 a.m. on Monday, May 6, 1895; eleven stations opened that day, including Marshfield. Upon its opening, the Metropolitan became the first revenue electric elevated railroad in the United States. The Garfield Park branch opened on June 19, but service on the Douglas Park branch was delayed until April 28, 1896.

The Metropolitan's lines were originally operated by the West Side Construction Company, which had been responsible for constructing them, and were transferred to the Metropolitan on October 6, 1896. The backers and officers of the two companies were largely identical, however, so this transfer of ownership was nominal. The expenses incurred in constructing the Metropolitan's vast trackage would catch up to the company, which entered receivership in 1897. The similarly-named Metropolitan West Side Elevated Railway Company was organized in January 1899 and assumed operations on February 3 of that year. 

The interurban Aurora Elgin and Chicago Railway (AE&C) was incorporated in 1901 and began service on August 25, 1902, between Aurora and the Garfield Park branch's station on 52nd Avenuelater renamed "Laramie Avenue"in Chicago. The AE&C and Metropolitan entered a trackage rights agreement in 1905, effective March 11, whereby AE&C trains were allowed to go into downtown Chicago via the Metropolitan's tracks and Wells Street Terminal and the Metropolitan could extend its service westward on AE&C tracks to its station on Des Plaines Avenue. Having gone bankrupt in 1919 due to rising inflation from World War I and state regulations, the AE&C was split into two parts, one of which was the Chicago Aurora and Elgin Railroad (CA&E), in 1921.

The Metropolitan, along with the other companies operating "L" lines in Chicago, became a part of the Chicago Elevated Railways (CER) trust on July 1, 1911. CER acted as a de facto holding company for the "L"unifying its operations, instituting the same management across the companies, and instituting free transfers between the lines starting in 1913but kept the underlying companies intact. This continued until the companies were formally merged into the single Chicago Rapid Transit Company (CRT), which assumed operations on January 9, 1924; the former Metropolitan was designated the Metropolitan Division of the CRT for administrative purposes. Although municipal ownership of transit had been a hotly-contested issue for half a century, the publicly-owned Chicago Transit Authority (CTA) would not be created until 1945, or assume operation of the "L" until October 1, 1947.

Closure and demolition

Plans for Chicago to have a subway system to relieve the severe congestion of, if not replace, its elevated trackage dated back to the early 20th century, but the city lagged in building subways. Chicago petitioned the Public Works Administration (PWA) for construction funds for a subway under State Street in 1937. The petition originally included a proposal for two downtown east-west streetcar tunnels. Harold L. Ickes, the administrator of the PWA and a longtime Chicagoan, vetoed the streetcar tunnel plan and insisted instead on a Milwaukee-Dearborn subway that would provide a more direct route from Logan Square to downtown. Although this idea engendered considerable local opposition, especially from mayor Edward Joseph Kelly, Ickes's influence in the federal government led to the Dearborn plan being adopted in 1938. A 1939 plan also introduced the idea of replacing the main line and Garfield Park branch with a section of rapid transit operating through a superhighway (the eventual Interstate 290 or "Eisenhower") on Congress Street that had been proposed since the 1909 Plan of Chicago and more thoroughly planned in the early 1930s. These sections of transit would be connected, allowing for the northwest side's rapid transit to be routed through downtown rather than adhere to a trunk-and-branch model. Work soon began on the subway, which was 82 percent complete when World War II forced its suspension in 1942. It finally opened on February 25, 1951, rerouting Logan Square and Humboldt Park trains from Marshfield Junction.

Construction on the expressway and Congress Line, on the other hand, had not started even though it had been adopted by the City Council in 1940 and formally authorized for construction in 1946. Clearance of the right of way began in 1949 and was largely complete by 1952, by which time only the "L" structure survived in the path of the future expressway. Three different agreements were made between the CTA, Chicago, Cook County, and Illinois between 1951 and 1954 concerning the financing and ownership of the new construction, which soon commenced. Changes were made to the Garfield Park and Douglas Park lines on December 9, 1951. Several stations were closed, including Laflin to Marshfield's east on the main line. Skip-stop, wherein trains were designated as either "A" trains or "B" trains and stopped at respective "A" or "B" stations, was applied during weekdays to the surviving stations; Marshfield was designated an "all-stop" station under this scheme and was thus unaffected.

As construction progressed, Garfield trains were rerouted from the "L" structure to temporary at-grade trackage running directly on Van Buren Street between Kedzie and Halsted, exclusive, ceasing to make intermediate stops in that area; this included the main line stations of Marshfield and Racine. In the process, Marshfield became a "B" station and Halsted became the transfer point between Garfield Park and Douglas Park trains. These changes impacted westbound trains on September 20, 1953, and eastbound trains on September 27. The CA&E, having long struggled financially, refused to use the at-grade tracks due to safety concerns as well as the prospect of delays caused by the use of traffic signals at road crossings, and had serious doubts about its ability to reroute its right of way into the new expressway median. Despite some speculative plans for alternative train service to downtown Chicago, and after being disallowed by state regulators to abandon rail service altogether in favor of buses, the CA&E ultimately abandoned service east of Des Plaines on September 20. This left Douglas Park trains as the sole remaining traffic for Marshfield and Racine, which remained temporarily open for them.

Douglas Park trains started using the Paulina Connectorthe old Logan Square structure, connected to the Lake Street Elevatedto get to the Loop on April 4, 1954, removing the last traffic to Marshfield and Racine; they were demolished soon afterwards. After the change, Douglas Park riders needing to transfer to westbound Garfield Park trains were advised to use the Madison/Wells station in the Loop, whereas eastbound Garfield Park riders headed for Douglas Park were recommended to switch at State/Van Buren. The Congress Line was complete in the area of Marshfield and opened on June 22, 1958, combined with the subway and Douglas Park branchby then simply the "Douglas" branchas the new "West-Northwest Route". The route had a new station on Racine Avenue as the final station before the divergence of the Douglas branch from the line. West of the junction, the Medical Center station on the Congress Line contained an auxiliary exit and part-time entrance on Paulina Street, a block west of Marshfield Avenue.

Station details
The station was located at 416 South Marshfield Avenue in the Near West Side neighborhood of Chicago. The Metropolitan boasted of providing water closets, water fountains, newsstands, and waiting rooms at its stations, which also included racks for bicycles, staff to announce those in waiting rooms of approaching trains, and space for baby carriages. Unlike elsewhere on the "L", the Metropolitan's station houses had central heating and basements.

Marshfield had two island platforms, one each between an inner and outer track; after the AE&C began service, an additional side platform was constructed on the northern Garfield Park track west of the junction. A pedestrian bridge linked both "L" platforms and the interurban platform. East of the station, the tracks crossed over and became two bidirectional pairs rather than two pairs in the same direction. Trains bound for or coming from Logan Square and Humboldt Park used the northern tracks and island platform, while trains bound for or coming from Garfield Park and Douglas Park used the southern tracks and platform. Three switches existed at this interlocking, all of which were hand-thrown. The junction's switches and signals were constructed by the Paige Iron Works of Chicago. The tower for the junction was located on the southern platform. West of Marshfield, another junction involved the Douglas Park branch diverging from the Garfield Park tracks. This divergence, combined with the crossover, has led to descriptions of the junction as "actually consist[ing] of two junctions".

Operations

By 1898, this schedule was updated so that trains ran at 30-minute intervals on each branch, or 7.5 minutes on the main line, during night hours. Trains running the Westchester branch, which was a western extension of the Garfield Park branch opened in 1926, did not stop at Marshfield, instead running express from Canal on the main line to Laramie on the Garfield Park branch.

The CA&E stopped at Marshfield to board westbound passengers and alight eastbound passengers; lest it compete with the "L" directly, patrons were not allowed to board eastbound trains at Marshfield, nor were westbound passengers allowed to alight at stations within the "L" area of service. As early as 1934, several morning rush hour CA&E trains a day stopped at Laflin instead of Marshfield to discharge eastbound passengers. By 1950, such trains, now the majority of morning rush hour trains, instead used Ogden for eastbound alightment, although the remainder of CA&E trains continued eastbound alightment at Marshfield. At the crossover east of Marshfield, CA&E trains were usually given priority over slower "L" trains.

Unlike other elevated railroads at the time, the Metropolitan did not sell tickets for passengers to present to staff; instead customers gave their fare to the station agent to record in a registry, a practice similar to streetcars. This practice was ultimately adopted by the other elevateds. Station agents on the Metropolitan were originally on duty 24 hours a day; fare collection by on-train conductors was adopted on various Metropolitan branches for night and off-peak hours during the 20th century, although the main line maintained 24-hour station agents throughout its existence. The CA&E, on the other hand, sold tickets to be checked by conductors. Tickets could be purchased either at a station or on the train; full-fare tickets sold on trains came with a dime ($ in 2021) surcharge on those bought in advance.

Neighborhood and connections
A working-class neighborhood grew up around the station, supplanting what had been a fashionable area. Underneath the CA&E platform was the Dreamland Ballroom, a venue that was at one time owned by the CRT. Located near the station was the Coyne Electrical School and the Presbyterian Hospital, and the headquarters of the retail cataloger Alden's. By the 1940s, the neighborhood was inhabited by people of African, Greek, Italian, Jewish, and Mexican ancestry; it was considered blighted by officials and the public, but residents contested that description.

A streetcar ran on Ashland Avenue by the late 19th century; in the vicinity of the station, it turned west to run north from Paulina Street to avoid running on a boulevard, before turning back east to Ashland. By the early- to mid-20th century, this route was one of the "Big Five" streetcar lines in Chicago, which had the highest ridership, received the most amenities, and had the shortest wait times. Another streetcar route ran on Van Buren Street adjacent to the Metropolitan's tracks, being powered by horse until it was electrified in 1896. Such streetcars were a competitor to the Metropolitan, siphoning many of its would-be passengers during the warm summer months as their cars were more open-air. As of 1928, both routes had owl service. Buses replaced streetcars on Van Buren on August 12, 1951. The eastbound Van Buren streetcar track remained until it was removed to construct the temporary westbound Garfield Park "L" track, but the westbound track survived through the highway construction and opening of the Congress Line. Ashland's streetcars were replaced by buses on May 11, 1952, for weekends, and altogether on February 13, 1954.

Ridership
In 1900, the earliest year data is available, Marshfield served 499,538 "L" passengers. Afterwards, ridership steadily increased throughout the following decades until it peaked at 1,538,319 in 1926. Ridership last exceeded one million in 1929 before declining substantially to roughly 1900s levels. In the last full year of its operation, 1953, Marshfield served 688,433 passengers on the "L", a 3.48 percent decline from the 713,264 of 1951; ridership statistics are unavailable throughout the entire "L" for 1952. For the part of 1954 it was open, Marshfield served 135,928 passengers. For 1953, Marshfield was in the exact middle of the main line's ridership, surpassing Racine and Franklin/Van Buren but underperforming Canal and Halsted. For the "L" system as a whole, Marshfield's 1951 performance made it the 65th-busiest of 131 "L" stations that were at least partially-staffed at the beginning of the year, while in 1953 it was the 68th-busiest of 137 such stations. Accounting for the part of 1954 it was open, it had the 114th-highest patronage out of those 137 stations. These statistics only measured the number of passengers who originated a trip from Marshfield rather than used it as a transfer, so are likely underestimates of the true patronage of the station.

Although the CA&E did not collect ridership statistics by station, the railroad's total ridership was less than four million annually starting in 1949, and declining in that period of time. After the September 1953 suspension of direct "one-seat ride" service into Chicago, the railroad lost half of these riders by December as riders opted instead for the nearby Chicago and North Western Railroad (C&NW, modern-day Union Pacific West Line) or automobiles to get into the city. Faced with this onslaught, the CA&E discontinued passenger service altogether at midday on July 3, 1957. Passengers who had taken the morning trains to Chicago were caught unaware by this development and had to find alternative transportation home.

Notes

References

Works cited

External links
A narrated late-1940s/early-1950s view of Marshfield station

1895 establishments in Illinois
1954 disestablishments in Illinois
Defunct Chicago "L" stations
Railway stations in the United States opened in 1895
Railway stations closed in 1954